George Vander Sluis (1915–1984) was an American artist.

Personal life
Sluis was born December 18, 1915, in Cleveland, Ohio. He was married and had three children with his wife, Hildegarde Bristol Vander Sluis, who survived to 2009.

Work
Serving in the United States Army in World War II, Vander Sluis was one of the 1,100 members of the Ghost Army, a secret tactical deception unit that was awarded the Congressional Gold Medal in 2022. After the war he was a member of the art faculty at Syracuse University for 35 years. Just before his death, Vander Sluis painted a mural on the front of the Hendricks Chapel at Syracuse.

He painted a New Deal program mural in the U.S. Post Office at Rifle, Colorado, in 1942, which is described in the listing of the building in the National Register of Historic Places. He also designed stamps for the United States Postal Service.

The Akron Art Museum holds a Sluis work titled Decayed Glory.

References

External links
 

1915 births
1984 deaths
American artists
Section of Painting and Sculpture artists
Syracuse University faculty
American muralists
Painters from Ohio
Painters from New York (state)
World War II artists
United States Army personnel of World War II